The 1991 Sunkist Fiesta Bowl, part of the 1990 bowl game season, took place on January 1, 1991, at Sun Devil Stadium in Tempe, Arizona. The competing teams were the Alabama Crimson Tide, representing the Southeastern Conference (SEC), and the Louisville Cardinals, competing as a football independent. In what was the 20th edition of the Fiesta Bowl, Louisville won the game 34–7.

Teams

Alabama

Under new coach Gene Stallings, Alabama's secondary coach under Bear Bryant from 1958–64, the 1990 Alabama squad opened the season ranked No. 13 only to be upset by Southern Miss, led by quarterback Brett Favre, in the opening game en route to an 0–3 start. The Crimson Tide also lost to Florida and Georgia during the skid.

The Tide recovered to win six of their next seven, losing only to Penn State in the final meeting between the schools for 20 years. Following its 24–3 victory over LSU, Alabama accepted a bid to the Fiesta Bowl.

Alabama concluded the regular season with a victory in the Iron Bowl vs. Auburn, giving it a final regular season record of 7–4. The appearance marked the first for Alabama in the Fiesta Bowl.

Stallings, who was fired by the National Football League's Phoenix Cardinals with five games remaining in the 1989 season, coached in college for the first time since leading Texas A&M in 1971.

Louisville

The Cardinals, known mostly for their basketball prowess under Denny Crum, enjoyed their finest football season to date under Kentucky native Howard Schnellenberger, who was an assistant under Bryant with Stallings before the latter was named head coach at Texas A&M in 1965.

Game summary
Cardinals quarterback Browning Nagle started the scoring with a 70-yard touchdown pass to Latrell Ware to give Louisville an early 7–0 lead. Running back Ralph Dawkins scored next on a 5-yard touchdown run to increase Louisville's lead to 13–0. Nagle later threw a 37-yard touchdown pass to Anthony Cummings giving the Cards a 19–0 lead after the 2-point conversion attempt failed. Alabama's next possession resulted in a blocked punt, which Louisville recovered in the end zone for a touchdown. Another failed 2-point conversion kept the lead at 25–0, a huge lead Louisville raced to after one quarter.

In the second quarter, Louisville had the ball again, before backup quarterback Jeff Brohm threw an interception, that was returned 49 yards for an Alabama touchdown. The interception returned for a touchdown cut the lead to 25–7, but those would be the only points Alabama would score the entire game. Louisville's defense shut down the Alabama offense.

In the third quarter, Nagle threw a 19-yard touchdown pass to Anthony Cummings to give Louisville a 32–7 lead. Louisville's last points came in the fourth quarter on a safety, when Alabama's quarterback was called for intentional grounding in the end zone.

Controversy

The game was marred by the controversy surrounding Arizona voters' rejection of a state holiday in honor of slain civil rights movement leader Martin Luther King Jr., as a number of teams rejected an invitation to play in the game before Alabama agreed. Players on both teams altered their uniforms in King's memory. Louisville players wore a jersey patch reading, "The Dream Lives On" (referencing King's 1963 "I Have a Dream" speech), as well as a helmet decal representing the university's cultural diversity, while Alabama players wore black armbands with "MLK" on them. Additionally, Fiesta Bowl officials staged a halftime tribute to Dr. King. The rejection of Dr. King by the voters of Arizona would later cause the National Football League to withdraw its earlier decision to let Arizona host 1993's Super Bowl XXVII.

References

1990–91 NCAA football bowl games
1991
1991
1991
January 1991 sports events in the United States
1991 in sports in Arizona